West Wyalong is a 1949 painting by Australian artist Russell Drysdale. The painting depicts the main street of the New South Wales town of West Wyalong, with its characteristic bend. Curator of the Art Gallery of New South Wales, Barry Pearce, stated that it was one of Australia's ten greatest paintings.

The painting was conceived when Drysdale accompanied his friendthe barrister, and later Justice John Nagelon a trip to West Wyalong. 

Drysdale painted the work at his family home in Rose Bay, a harbourside neighbourhood of Sydney. Drysdale's daughter recalled how, as children, she and her brother had been allowed to play around it while he was working on it. A report accompanying an exhibition of his work stated that "Drysdale applied several layers of paint and glaze to render the details with utmost care: the architectural features, cast-iron balconies and posts, the Italianate shopfronts, the blinds lowered against the setting sun".

The painting was once owned by merchant John Landau. Landau allowed the work to be displayed at the Art Gallery of New South Wales until 1996 when his widow Joyce sold the artwork. It was purchased by television executive Reg Grundy and Joy Chambers-Grundy, who retained ownership until at least 2014. The work was hung in the Grundy's London penthouse for around 15 years. 

The Art Gallery of New South Wales attempted to purchase the painting at the time but were outbid with the painting selling for "nearly one million dollars". The Curator of the gallery at the time, Barry Pearce, said that it was "the most broken hearted I have been about missing out on a masterpiece." 

Bland Shire commissioned a bronze and stainless steel bas-relief sculpture commemorating Drysdale's work. The sculpturesited outside the Tattersalls Hotel in West Wyalongwas unveiled in February 2014.

References

Paintings by Russell Drysdale
1949 paintings